The St. Francis Brooklyn Terriers  are the 21 teams that represent St. Francis College in athletics. The Terriers are members of NCAA Division I and participate in the Northeast Conference (NEC) except in two sports that the NEC does not sponsor—men's and women's water polo. The water polo teams respectively compete in the Collegiate Water Polo Association and the Metro Atlantic Athletic Conference.

The school's mascot is Rocky the Terrier, he was officially introduced in 1933 by the college's athletic association. Previously the St. Francis's student-athletes were referred to as the Boys from Brooklyn. Notably, the St. Francis Brooklyn men's basketball program was founded in 1896 and is the oldest collegiate program in New York City.  The basketball, volleyball, water polo, and swimming and diving teams for the Terriers compete in the Generoso Pope Athletic Complex. The soccer teams complete at Brooklyn Bridge Park, Pier 5.

History
In 2006, St. Francis College added women's bowling, while dropping men's baseball and women's softball.

St. Francis College previously sponsored a football team, but was dropped in 1935.
 Their last coach was Julius "Indian" Yablok a former quarterback at Colgate University, who replaced Salvatore "Tut" Maggio.

In 2007, Irma Garcia became the athletic director of the Terriers replacing longtime director Edward Aquilone. When hired in 2010, she was the country's only female Latina athletic director in Division I sports. For the 2014–15 academic year, Garcia was named  NACWAA D1 (FCS) Administrator of the Year. The award was in part because of the Terriers success in Men's Soccer (NEC Champions and NCAA Tournament Participants), Men's Basketball (NEC Regular Season Champions and NIT Participants) and Women's Basketball (NEC Champions and NCAA Tournament Participants).

Beginning on November 27, 2012, St. Francis College rebranded its athletic programs from St. Francis (NY) to St. Francis Brooklyn. The college previously came to be known as St. Francis (NY) when the athletics program joined the Division I Northeast Conference in 1981. In 2018 it was announced that women's soccer and men's volleyball would be added as sports programs to the existing teams at St. Francis College. Both teams started play in the 2019–20 school year, with women's soccer starting in fall 2019 and men's volleyball in spring 2020.

The most recent change to SFC's sports affiliation was announced on September 30, 2021, when the NEC announced it would start a men's volleyball league in the 2023 season (2022–23 school year). The new league was intended to start with SFC as one of six members, but two more schools were announced as single-sport members before the league began play. Before the launch of NEC men's volleyball, SFC had played the 2022 season in the Eastern Intercollegiate Volleyball Association, which it had joined in July 2021.

Teams
A member of the Northeast Conference, St. Francis Brooklyn sponsors teams in 10 men's and 11 women's NCAA sanctioned sports:

Men's Intercollegiate Sports
 Basketball (team article)
 Cross Country
 Golf 
 Soccer (team article)
 Swimming & Diving
 Tennis
 Track & Field (Indoor & Outdoor)
 Volleyball
 Water Polo

Women's Intercollegiate Sports
 Basketball (team article)    
 Bowling 
 Cross Country
 Golf
 Soccer (team article)
 Swimming & Diving
 Tennis
 Track & Field (Indoor & Outdoor)
 Volleyball
 Water Polo

Basketball
Both the men's and women's teams host their home games at The Pope and are members of the Northeast Conference. The fiercest rival of the Terriers is LIU; the men's teams have competed since 1928 and the women's teams since 1973. Both the men's and women's Terrier teams play in the Battle of Brooklyn tournament against the Sharks, which has been played annually since 1974–75. The Terriers also compete against the Wagner Seahawks, and it is referred to as Battle of the Verrazano due to St. Francis College in Brooklyn being separated from Wagner College in Staten Island by the Verrazano-Narrows Bridge. The Battle of the Verrazano dates back to the 1973–74 season. The team plays its home games on the Peter Aquilone Court at the Generoso Pope Athletic Complex.

Men's

The St. Francis College's men's basketball program, founded in 1896, is the oldest collegiate program in New York City. The Terriers' best finish was the 1955–1956 season, with a 21–4 record that ranked them at 13th nationally in the AP polls. Throughout their history the Terriers have played as NCAA Division I independents, in the Metropolitan New York Conference (1946–1963), in the Metropolitan Collegiate Conference (1966–1968) and since 1981 in the NEC. In that time span, the Terriers were regular season conference champions 6 times and have had 17 different head coaches, the latest of which is Glenn Braica. Braica was an assistant under Norm Roberts at St. John's University. Glenn Braica replaced Brian Nash who resigned after five seasons, 3 of which his team did not make the postseason.

The Terriers coach with the most wins is Daniel Lynch who from 1948 to 1969 accumulated a 282–233 record and won 3 regular season conference championships. Lynch also led the Terriers to 3 NIT bids, reaching the first-round in 1963, the quarter-finals in 1954 and the semi-finals in 1956. Second is Ron Ganulin, who over 14 seasons, from 1991 to 2005, accumulated a 187–206 record along with 2 regular season conference championships.

Women's

The women's team kicked off intercollegiate athletics at St. Francis College in 1973. Since the 1988–89 season the women's basketball team has been a part of the Northeast Conference. The Terriers coach with the most wins is John Thurston who from 2012 to 2018 accumulated a 73–110 record. Thurston also was the first coach in program history to win a Northeast Conference tournament Championship and participate in an NCAA tournament. Also under Thurston, the 2013–14 squad set the single-season program record with 19 victories. In 2018, Linda Cimino was announced as the head coach. Previously, Cimino was the head coach at Binghamton. In Cimino's first year at the helm, she set the Terrier record for conference wins in a season, 12.

Water polo

Both the men's and women's water polo teams play at the St. Francis College Aquatics Center, located at the college in Brooklyn Heights. The men's team competes in the CWPA and ECAC and the women's team in the MAAC, both participate in Division I leagues.

Men's

The St. Francis College  Men's Water Polo club began its program in 1952. In the 1970s, St. Francis helped to form the association of East Coast schools that eventually became the Collegiate Water Polo Association. The Terriers have enjoyed much success and are one of the better teams on the east coast. In consecutive years from 2004 to 2008, they've won the ECAC Championships and the CWPA Northern Division Championships. The Terriers have finished between first and fourth in the Eastern Championships from 1999 to 2007. In 2005 they finished first and qualified for the NCAA National Championships and finished fourth at the Final Four.

The team was headed by coach Carl Quigley, whom in 1999 was the coach of the year for the CWPA Northern Division. Coach Quigley headed the Terriers for 34 years, 1974–2008, and for many years had compiled a successful and diverse team, composed of Americans, Serbians, Hungarians and Israelis. From 2005 to 2008 under coach Quigley, the Terriers had a combined 82–25 record with four ECAC Championships, four CWPA Northern Division Championships, 1 NCAA Final Four berth and have been ranked as high as 11th nationally by the NCAA.

From 2009 to 2012, Igor Samardzija was the head coach; he finished his inaugural season at 12–6. At the end of the 2009 season, the Terriers were ranked in the NCAA Top 20 of the nation at #18. In 2010, the Terriers, under Igor Samardzija, finished the season having been ranked as high as No. 10 in the nation and made their second trip to the NCAA Final Four, finishing in fourth place. Also in 2010, the Terriers won the ECAC Championships, the Northern Division Championship tournament and the CWPA Eastern Championship. In the 2011 season, the Terriers won the CWPA Northern Division Championships, finished third in the Eastern Championships and ended the season ranked at 16th in the nation. For the third time in the programs history, the 2012 Terriers won the Eastern Championships and earned an NCAA final four birth. The Terriers also went on to defeat Air Force to win their first national tournament match for a third-place finish.

From 2013 to 2014, Srdjan Mihaljevic an alumnus of St. Francis College and former water polo player was the head coach. Mihaljevic inherited a team that placed third in the 2012 NCAA Final Four and was ranked tenth in preseason polls. In 2013, the Terriers went on to a 23–12 record and won the Northern Division and Eastern Championships, in the process qualifying for an NCAA National Championship berth. In winning back-to-back Eastern Championships, St. Francis joins Yale University (1972–74), Bucknell (1977–80), Brown (1983–85), the United States Naval Academy (1986–88, 2006–08) and the University of Massachusetts (1993–96, 1998–99) as the only programs in league history to claim back-to-back crowns. The championship marks the first in the career of first-year head coach Srdjan Mihaljevic as the former SFC assistant coach claimed the Dick Russell Coach of the Tournament award for guiding the Terriers to the program's fourth championship in eight appearances in the Championship Game. The Terriers defeated UC San Diego in the NCAA Men's Water Polo Championship play-in game. The Terriers then lost in the semi-finals to top seeded USC and in the consolation game to Stanford, to finish fourth in the NCAA Tournament. During the 2014 season, the Terriers under-performed and finished at 16–13. After the season head coach Srdjan Mihaljevic announced that he was resigning.

Former Olympian Igor Zagoruiko was named Head Coach for the 2015 season. At the beginning of the 2016 season, the Terriers were ranked at 20th in the CWPA's preseason poll. Under Zagoruiko, the Terriers were a mediocre 28–26 and did not win any postseason tournaments. For the 2017 season, the Terriers hired, alumnus Bora Dimitrov, the youngest head coach in NCAA varsity men's water polo at the time of his hiring.

Soccer

Both the Men's and Women's soccer teams plays their home matches at Brooklyn Bridge Park Pier 5, located on the East River in Brooklyn Heights, Brooklyn.

Men's

The St. Francis College Men's Soccer team has an overall record of 455–365–88 spanning from 1968 to 2019. In that time, the Terriers have made nine NCAA Tournament appearances and have won five NEC regular season championships and eight NEC Tournament Championships. Since joining the NEC in 1985, the team has posted a 137–117–26 record against conference teams and leads the conference with the most tournament championships.

The current head coach, Tom Giovatto, joined the Terriers in 2007 and has led the team to a 120–85–32 record. In 2009, Giovatto secured a NEC Tournament berth with the second seed and in 2013 he won the NEC Championship with the fourth seed. With the 2013 NEC Tournament Championship the Terriers received an automatic NCAA Tournament bid, where they lost in the first round. In 2014, the Terriers repeated as NEC Tournament Champions and participated in the NCAA Tournament again losing in the first round. In 2016, Giovatto won NEC Coach of the Year, after leading his team to an NEC Regular Season Championship, he then proceeded to win the 2016 NEC tournament and participate in the NCAA Division I Men's Soccer Championship. In 2017, Giovatto repeated the feat of winning Coach of the Year, the NEC Regular season championship and the NEC Tournament championship.

Women's

Women's Soccer at St. Francis College was founded in 2019. The programs first head coach was Justine Lombardi. In their inaugural season, the Terriers did not win a game and posted a 0–17–0 record.

Rocky the Terrier
The mascot of St. Francis Brooklyn is Rocky the Terrier. The mascot was officially adopted in 1933 by the college's athletic association.

Notable alumni
Vincent Bezecourt '16, signed with the New York Red Bulls of the Major League Soccer. 
Kasey Koslowski '01, three time all conference player and signed as a free agent by the Chicago White Sox
Jessica Zinobile '00, 62nd overall pick by the Sacramento Monarchs
John Mangieri '97, Pitcher drafted by the New York Mets, member of the Italian World Baseball Classic Team
John Halama '94, Major League Baseball Pitcher
Scott Pagano '92, Outfielder drafted by the Detroit Tigers in the 16th round
Donald Peters '90, 26th overall pick by the Oakland A's
Bernie Jenkins '88, Outfielder drafted by the Houston Astros in the 7th round
James Desapio '88, Pitcher drafted by the Houston Astros in the 23rd round
Luis Mallea '87, Pitcher drafted by the Kansas City Royals in the 25th round
Richard Simon '86, Pitcher drafted by the Houston Astros in the 6th round
Dragan Radovich '78, 3 time first team all-American goalkeeper and professional soccer player
Nestor Cora '78, 165th overall pick by the Washington Bullets
Dennis McDermott '74, 140th overall pick by the New York Knicks
Louis Anemone '71, 675th pick by the Minnesota Twins
Peter Scarpati '69, 910th overall pick by the Los Angeles Dodgers
Gil Radday '67, 84th overall pick by the New York Knicks
Paul DeLoca '65, RHP selected in the 60th round by the St. Louis Cardinals
Alvin B. Inniss '58, 40th overall pick by the Minneapolis Lakers
Walter Acamushko '57, 42nd overall pick by the Detroit Pistons
Dan Mannix, '56 selected by the Rochester Royals in the 1956 draft
Henry Daubenschmidt '54, 23rd overall pick by the Boston Celtics
Vernon Stokes '53, selected in the 6th round by the Boston Celtics
Jim Luisi, '51, 56th overall pick by the Boston Celtics
Roy Reardon '51, 75th overall pick by the Syracuse Nationals
Tom Gallagher '49, selected by the Baltimore Bullets in the 1949 draft

Footnotes

References

External links
 
SFC NEC Soccer History
SFC Soccer Record Book
 SFC Water Polo Accolades
 SFC Terriers Home Page
SFC Terriers Home Page

 
Sports clubs established in 1896